Ramón Avanceña y Quiosay (April 13, 1872 – June 12, 1957) was a Chief Justice of the Supreme Court of the Philippines. He served from 1925 to 1941, when he resigned at the beginning of the Japanese occupation of the Philippines during World War II.  He was from Villa de Arevalo, Iloilo City.

Early life and career
He earned his Bachelor of Arts at Colegio de San Juan de Letran and Bachelor of Laws at University of Santo Tomas.

Ramón Avanceña served as a legal adviser to the Federal State of the Visayas, the revolutionary government of provinces of Iloilo, Capiz and Antique, and was chosen to negotiate with the American forces on Panay during the Philippine–American War.

During the American Colonial Era, he was appointed as assistant attorney in the Bureau of Justice.  In 1905 he was appointed auxiliary judge. He was Attorney General of the Philippines from 1914 until 1917, when he was appointed to the Supreme Court as an Associate Justice. Upon the death of Manuel Araullo in 1924, he succeeded as Chief Justice, but he had to wait until 1925 to be formally appointed.

He was supposed to join Philippine Commonwealth President Manuel L. Quezon in exile during the onset of the Japanese Occupation, but worried that he would not be together with his family, he decided to stay put.

His sons, José, Alberto, and Jesús, became practicing attorneys.

The Ramon Avanceña National High School in Villa de Arevalo, Iloilo City and Ramon Avanceña High School in Quiapo, Manila are named after him.

References
 Cruz, Isagani A. (2000). Res Gestae: A Brief History of the Supreme Court. Rex Book Store, Manila

1872 births
1957 deaths
Colegio de San Juan de Letran alumni
Ramón Avanceña
Filipino collaborators with Imperial Japan
People from Iloilo City
Unofficial vice presidents of the Philippines
University of Santo Tomas alumni
Visayan people
Associate Justices of the Supreme Court of the Philippines